Burlorne may refer to the following places in Cornwall, England:

Burlorne Pillow
Burlorne Tregoose